Crestwood is a neighborhood in the Southwest section of Portland, Oregon located between SW 45th Ave. and Barbur Blvd., adjacent to Multnomah and Ashcreek. Woods Memorial Natural Area is located here, a swath of urban wilderness visited on occasion by elk.

References

Neighborhoods in Portland, Oregon